The 2011 Braintree District Council Elections took place on 5 May 2011 to elect members of Braintree District Council in England. This was on the same day as other local elections. All 60 councillors in 30 wards were up for election.

Summary

Candidates by party

Results

|}

Ward results

Black Notley

Bocking Blackwater

Bocking North

Bocking South

Bradwell, Silver End and Rivenhall

Braintree Central

Braintree East

Braintree South

Bumpstead

Coggeshall and North Feering

Cressing and Stisted

Gosfield and Greenstead Green

Great Notley and Braintree West

Halstead St. Andrew's

Halstead Trinity

Hatfield Peverel

Hedingham and Maplestead

Kelvedon

Panfield

Rayne

Stour Valley North

Stour Valley South

Three Fields

Upper Colne

Witham Chipping Hill and Central

Witham North

Witham South

Witham West

Yeldham

By-elections

Braintree East (March 2012)

A by-election was called due to the resignation of Cllr David Messer (Conservative).

Braintree South

A by-election was called due to the resignation of Cllr Stephen Sandbrook (Conservative).

Great Notley and Braintree West

A by-election was called due to the resignation of Cllr Claire Sandbrook (Conservative).

Braintree East (July 2013)

A by-election was called due to the death of Cllr Eric Lynch (Labour). Percentage changes compared to the 2012 by-election.

References

2011
2011 English local elections